Les Hôpitaux-Vieux is a commune in the Doubs département in the Bourgogne-Franche-Comté region in eastern France.

Geography
The commune is situated on the Roman road from Besançon to Italy.

The highest point in the commune is the Mont de l'Herba at 1303 m.

History
The history of the commune is linked to Jean de Chalon, Duke of Burgundy. He established a hospital, first designed to treat the wounded in battle, and then to combat leprosy and the plague, which raged from 1346 to 1349.

The two distance names of Hôpitaux-Vieux and Hôpitaux-Neufs first appear in a document of 1393.

The village was entirely destroyed in July 1639 in the Thirty Years' War. As late as 1688, there were still only 37 homes that had been rebuilt.

The village did not have its own church until 1664, but was dependent on the parish of Saint-Maurice.

Population

Economy
Agriculture was the principal activity in the commune until the end of the 20th century, when tourism became important because of the construction of the ski resort of Métabief-Mont d'Or.

See also
 Les Hôpitaux-Neufs
 Communes of the Doubs department

References

External links

 Communal Web site

Communes of Doubs